A penumbral lunar eclipse will take place on February 22, 2035. It will be visible to the naked eye as 96.52% of the Moon will be immersed in Earth's penumbral shadow.

Visibility 
It will be visible before sunrise east of North America though the Moon will have set below the horizon east of South America while it'll still be visible from the rest of South America.

Related lunar eclipses

Lunar year series

Saros series
Lunar Saros series 114, repeating every 18 years and 11 days, has a total of 71 lunar eclipse events including 13 total lunar eclipses.

First Penumbral Lunar Eclipse: 0971 May 13

First Partial Lunar Eclipse: 1115 Aug 07

First Total Lunar Eclipse: 1458 Feb 28

First Central Lunar Eclipse: 1530 Apr 12

Greatest Eclipse of Lunar Saros 114: 1584 May 24

Last Central Lunar Eclipse: 1638 Jun 26

Last Total Lunar Eclipse: 1674 Jul 17

Last Partial Lunar Eclipse: 1890 Nov 26

Last Penumbral Lunar Eclipse: 2233 Jun 22

See also 
List of lunar eclipses and List of 21st-century lunar eclipses

Notes

External links 
 

2035-02
2035-02
2035 in science